Paul Michael Kelly  (born 12 October 1969) is an English former footballer who played as a right-back or defensive midfielder for West Ham United. He made a single appearance in the Football League.

Kelly played schoolboy football for England and spent two years at the FA School of Excellence at Lilleshall between 1984 and 1986. He made 11 appearances for England Youth.

After rejoining West Ham United as an apprentice, Kelly became a reserve team regular. He made a single Second Division appearance for West Ham, coming on as a second-half substitute for Steve Potts in a 1–2 defeat against Hull City on 20 January 1990. On 19 December, he made his only other first-team appearance, playing the full match against Luton Town in the second round of the 1990–91 Full Members' Cup, a match that ended in a 5–1 defeat.

He was released in May 1991 and was picked up by Gillingham, where he played in a pre-season friendly against his old club, but thereafter gave up football.

Career statistics

References

External links
Paul Kelly at westhamstats.info

1969 births
Living people
Footballers from Bexley
English footballers
Association football fullbacks
Association football midfielders
West Ham United F.C. players
England youth international footballers
English Football League players